The House of Schulman, also written Schulmann, Schuman, Schumann, Shulman, Sholman, Scholman and Koulumies, is a Baltic German noble family of German origin, represented at the Swedish and Finnish houses of nobility, first mentioned in 1495 on the island of Ösel.

Schulman is also a common surname among Ashkenazi Jews, some of whom are confirmed relatives of this noble line.

History
Their reputed origins lie in East Frisia: the Schul- element of the name apparently originates from the German word "Schole" (meaning "shoal").

The family came to the Baltic as part of the Teutonic Order and is first mentioned in the 15th century.  Continuous descent of the current family only goes back to 1495 with the mention of Toennis von Schulmann in Pöide.

Pöide Church is site of the grave of Heinrich von Schulmann, beheaded by the Danes in 1613.  The gravestone in the church has him as a headless knight.

In the 17th century the family split into two branches, the existing one in Estonia and a new in Sweden.  The Swedish branch then developed the Finnish branch in the 18th century.

The elder branch of the family resided in Estonia till 1939 when they resettled in the Wartegau in Germany. After World War II the few still remaining resettled in Germany and Canada.

Nobility
The family was ennobled in Estonia, Livonia, Courland, Oesel, Swedish Nobility and Finnish Nobility. Only the last two are still recognized today.

Notable members

Alex Schulman

References

External links
 Handbuch der baltischen Ritterschaften: Estland - Genealogy handbook of Baltic nobility
 Genealogisches Handbuch der Oeselschen Ritterschaften, 1935 - Genealogy handbook of the Oesel Noble Corporation

German noble families
Baltic nobility
Finnish noble families
Swedish noble families
Finnish families of German ancestry